USS ATR-31 was an ATR-1-class Rescue Ocean Tug of the United States Navy during World War II, and later the Peruvian Navy. Her fate is unknown.

Ship History
ATR-31 was laid down by Northwest Shipbuilding Company on 7 September 1942 in South Bellingham, Washington. She was launched on 30 July 1943.

U.S. Navy Service
ATR-31 was commissioned into U.S. Naval Service on 30 October 1943. During World War II, ATR-31 was assigned to the Asiatic-Pacific Theater and participated in the Ormoc Bay and Leyte landings, as well as operations in West New Guinea. After the war, she was decommissioned sometime in 1945. ATR-31 was struck from the Naval Register in 1946.

Peruvian Navy Service
On 5 September 1947, the ship was transferred to the Republic of Peru, and began Peruvian Naval Service as the BAP Condestable Selendon (Q01). She was known to be in active service as of 10 February 1954. Her fate is unknown.

Ship Awards
ATR-31 received two Battle Stars for World War II service.

References

Ships of the United States Navy
1943 ships